The Headwall Lakes are in a valley south-east of Mount Chester in Kananaskis Country in Alberta, Canada.   They can be accessed from the Smith-Dorrien / Spray Trail road.  Their waters flow down Headwall Creek into Smith-Dorrien Creek then south east into Lower Kananaskis Lake

References

Kananaskis Improvement District
Lakes of Alberta